Budd Inlet is an inlet located at the southern end of Puget Sound in Thurston County, Washington. It is the southernmost arm of Puget Sound.

Etymology
Budd Inlet was named by Charles Wilkes during the United States Exploring Expedition, to honor Thomas A. Budd, who served as acting master of the Peacock and Vincennes. A portion of the coast of Antarctica, Budd Coast, is also named for Thomas Budd.

History

Historically, the shores surrounding Budd Inlet were occupied by village sites of the Steh-Chass (or Stehchass), Lushootseed-speaking peoples who became part of the post-treaty Squaxin Island Tribe.

Around 1850, American settlers founded the city of Olympia at the southern end of Budd Inlet.

Geography
The southern end of Budd Inlet is divided into two channels – West Bay and East Bay – by a peninsula that was artificially broadened throughout the late 19th and early 20th century.

The Deschutes River empties into West Bay just north of Tumwater Falls. The mudflats that existed here were dammed and submerged beneath Capitol Lake in 1949.

A deepwater shipping channel was dredged in East Bay to provide deep water access to the Port of Olympia.

See also
Mud Bay
Henderson Inlet

References

External links

Bodies of water of Thurston County, Washington
History of Olympia, Washington
Geography of Olympia, Washington
Inlets of Washington (state)